Union Township is a township in Hunterdon County, in the U.S. state of New Jersey.  The southwest half of the township lies on what is known as the Hunterdon Plateau, the northwest corner consists of the Musconetcong Ridge and the northeast section is part of the lower-lying Newark Basin around Spruce Run Reservoir. As of the 2020 United States census, the township's population was 6,507, an increase of 599 (+10.1%) from the 2010 census count of 5,908, which in turn reflected a decline of 252 (−4.1%) from the 6,160 counted in the 2000 census.

Union was incorporated as a township by an act of the New Jersey Legislature on February 17, 1853, from portions of Bethlehem Township. Clinton Town was formed on April 5, 1865, within portions of the township, and became an independent municipality in 1895. The township was named for Union Furnace, which was producing iron from 1742 until the 1780s. The name "Union" was chosen over the alternative "Rockhill", which was a community at the southern end of the township.

Union Furnace and its forge produced cannonballs for the Revolutionary War and shoes for horses and oxen, as well as farm implements. Farms and fields were established in areas where trees were felled to provide fuel for the furnace. A farm community developed, together with basket making and tanning industries.

New Jersey Monthly magazine ranked Union Township 21st in its 2008 rankings of the "Best Places To Live" in New Jersey.

Geography
According to the United States Census Bureau, township had a total area of 20.63 square miles (53.43 km2), including 18.77 square miles (48.60 km2) of land and 1.86 square miles (4.83 km2) of water (9.03%).

Unincorporated communities, localities and place names located partially or completely within the township include Coles Mills, Grandin, Hensfoot, Jutland, Kingtown, Mechlings Corner, Mount Salem, Norton, Pattenburg, Perryville, Polktown and Van Syckel.

Pittstown is an unincorporated community that is also spread across Alexandria Township and Franklin Township.

The township borders the Hunterdon County municipalities of Alexandria Township, Bethlehem Township, Clinton, Clinton Township, Franklin Township and Lebanon Township.

Demographics

Two large state facilities in the township, the Edna Mahan Correctional Facility for Women (with 650 inmates in 2018) and Hunterdon Developmental Center (which had 480 residents as of 2017), account for almost 20% of the residents counted by the Census Bureau. Their inclusion skews the township's demographic characteristics. The unusual ratio of 100 females there vs. 77.5 males and the presence of 12.5% of residents but no families being below the poverty linen is largely due to the nature of the residents of these two facilities.

2010 census

The Census Bureau's 2006–2010 American Community Survey showed that (in 2010 inflation-adjusted dollars) median household income was $103,304 (with a margin of error of +/− $11,761) and the median family income was $126,157 (+/− $23,039). Males had a median income of $97,548 (+/− $31,580) versus $62,130 (+/− $7,607) for females. The per capita income for the borough was $33,753 (+/− $7,431). About none of families and 12.5% of the population were below the poverty line, including none of those under age 18 and 13.8% of those age 65 or over.

2000 census
As of the 2000 United States census there were 6,160 people, 1,666 households, and 1,162 families residing in the township.  The population density was 324.8 people per square mile (125.4/km2).  There were 1,725 housing units at an average density of 90.9 per square mile (35.1/km2).  The racial makeup of the township was 81.83% White, 13.36% African American, 0.18% Native American, 1.59% Asian, 0.02% Pacific Islander, 1.59% from other races, and 1.43% from two or more races. Hispanic or Latino of any race were 5.13% of the population.

There were 1,666 households, out of which 35.9% had children under the age of 18 living with them, 62.4% were married couples living together, 4.6% had a female householder with no husband present, and 30.2% were non-families. 24.3% of all households were made up of individuals, and 5.4% had someone living alone who was 65 years of age or older.  The average household size was 2.61 and the average family size was 3.18.

In the township the population was spread out, with 19.2% under the age of 18, 5.9% from 18 to 24, 43.4% from 25 to 44, 25.0% from 45 to 64, and 6.6% who were 65 years of age or older. The median age was 38 years. For every 100 females, there were 71.0 males.  For every 100 females age 18 and over, there were 65.2 males.

The median income for a household in the township was $81,089, and the median income for a family was $102,146. Males had a median income of $64,375 versus $41,795 for females. The per capita income for the township was $29,535.  About 0.4% of families and 1.6% of the population were below the poverty line, including 1.3% of those under age 18 and 4.2% of those age 65 or over.

Government

Local government
Union Township is governed under the Township form of New Jersey municipal government, one of 141 municipalities (of the 564) statewide that use this form, the second-most commonly used form of government in the state. The Township Committee is comprised of five members, who are elected directly by the voters at-large in partisan elections to serve three-year terms of office on a staggered basis, with either one or two seats coming up for election each year as part of the November general election in a three-year cycle. At an annual reorganization meeting, the Township Committee selects one of its members to serve as Mayor and another as Deputy Mayor.

, members of the Union Township Committee are Mayor David DeGiralamo (R, term on committee ends December 31, 2024; term as mayor ends 2022), Deputy Mayor Page Stiger (R, term on committee and as deputy mayor ends 2022), Bruce R. Hirt (R, 2023), Richard Lordi (R, 2024) and Frank T. Mazza (R, 2023).

In February 2019, the Township Committee selected Page Stiger from a list of three candidates nominated by the Republican municipal committee to fill the seat expiring in December 2019 that was vacated by Michael Sroka when he resigned from office the previous month.

In 2010, the Township's Environmental Commission earned Union Township the distinction of becoming the first community in Hunterdon County to achieve certification under the Sustainable Jersey program, which works to help communities reduce waste, cut greenhouse gas emissions and improve environmental equity.

Federal, state and county representation
Union Township is located in the 7th Congressional District and is part of New Jersey's 23rd state legislative district.

 

Two state facilities, the New Jersey Department of Corrections Edna Mahan Correctional Facility for Women (with 650 inmates in 2018), and the New Jersey Department of Human Services Hunterdon Developmental Center (which had 480 residents as of 2017), are located in Union Township.

Politics
As of March 2011, there were a total of 3,226 registered voters in Union Township, of which 1,335 (41.4%) were registered as Republicans, 574 (17.8%) were registered as Democrats, and 1,312 (40.7%) were registered as Unaffiliated. There were five voters registered as Libertarians or Greens.

In the 2012 presidential election, Republican Mitt Romney received 60.8% of the vote (1,545 cast), ahead of Democrat Obama with 37.6% (955 votes), and other candidates with 1.7% (42 votes), among the 2,560 ballots cast by the township's 3,416 registered voters (18 ballots were spoiled), for a turnout of 74.9%. In the 2008 presidential election, Republican John McCain received 58.9% of the vote here (1,568 cast), ahead of Democrat Barack Obama with 38.7% (1,030 votes) and other candidates with 1.3% (35 votes), among the 2,662 ballots cast by the township's 3,265 registered voters, for a turnout of 81.5%. In the 2004 presidential election, Republican George W. Bush received 64.3% of the vote here (1,566 ballots cast), outpolling Democrat John Kerry with 35.3% (860 votes) and other candidates with 1.1% (34 votes), among the 2,437 ballots cast by the township's 2,992 registered voters, for a turnout percentage of 81.5.

In the 2013 gubernatorial election, Republican Chris Christie received 77.2% of the vote (1,179 cast), ahead of Democrat Barbara Buono with 21.0% (321 votes), and other candidates with 1.8% (28 votes), among the 1,549 ballots cast by the township's 3,409 registered voters (21 ballots were spoiled), for a turnout of 45.4%. In the 2009 gubernatorial election, Republican Chris Christie received 70.9% of the vote here (1,303 ballots cast), ahead of Democrat Jon Corzine with 19.9% (366 votes), Independent Chris Daggett with 7.6% (139 votes) and other candidates with 0.4% (7 votes), among the 1,837 ballots cast by the township's 3,214 registered voters, yielding a 57.2% turnout.

Education
The Union Township School District serves students in pre-kindergarten through eighth grade. As of the 2018–19 school year, the district, comprised of two schools, had an enrollment of 436 students and 44.8 classroom teachers (on an FTE basis), for a student–teacher ratio of 9.7:1. Schools in the district (with 2018–2019 enrollment data from the National Center for Education Statistics) are 
Union Township Elementary School with 207 students in grades K–4 and 
Union Township Middle School with 225 students in grades 5–8.

Public school students in ninth through twelfth grades attend North Hunterdon High School in Annandale, which also serves students from Bethlehem Township, Clinton Town, Clinton Township, Franklin Township and Lebanon Borough. As of the 2018–19 school year, the high school had an enrollment of 1,584 students and 123.2 classroom teachers (on an FTE basis), for a student–teacher ratio of 12.9:1. The school is part of the North Hunterdon-Voorhees Regional High School District, which also includes students from Califon, Glen Gardner, Hampton, High Bridge, Lebanon Township and Tewksbury Township, who attend Voorhees High School in Lebanon Township.

Eighth grade students from all of Hunterdon County are eligible to apply to attend the high school programs offered by the Hunterdon County Vocational School District, a county-wide vocational school district that offers career and technical education at its campuses in Raritan Township and at programs sited at local high schools, with no tuition charged to students for attendance.

Transportation

Roads and highways

Union is accessible by a variety of roads. The most prominent roadway is Interstate 78 / U.S. 22, which run concurrently through Union Township. Route 173 passes through the center and eventually merges briefly with both. County Route 513 runs along the southeastern border while County Route 579 goes along the southwestern border.

Rail service
The Norfolk Southern Railway's Lehigh Line (formerly the mainline of the Lehigh Valley Railroad), runs through Union Township.

Notable people

People who were born in, residents of, or otherwise closely associated with Union Township include:

 Scott Bradlee (born 1981), musician, pianist, composer, and arranger best known for his viral videos on YouTube, including his work under the moniker Postmodern Jukebox
 Daniel Karcher (born 1964), is an NPR host and filmmaker, best known as host for WBGO, where he serves as the station's "full-time substitute host"
 John Penn (1729–1795), last colonial governor of Pennsylvania
 Charles Rinehart (1875–1933), football player, engineer and businessman who was elected to the College Football Hall of Fame in 1964
 Lloyd Wescott (1907–1990), agriculturalist, civil servant, and philanthropist
 Glenway Wescott (1911–1987), novelist during the 1920s and 1930s and a figure in the American expatriate literary community in Paris during the 1920s

References

External links

Township website
Web page for Union Township, Hunterdon County, New Jersey
Union Township School
Union Township Environmental Association Facebook page

Data for the Union Township School, National Center for Education Statistics
North Hunterdon-Voorhees Regional High School District
NY-NJTC: Hoffman Park Details and Info

 
1853 establishments in New Jersey
Populated places established in 1853
Township form of New Jersey government
Townships in Hunterdon County, New Jersey